Shoushan may refer to:
 Shoushan (Kaohsiung)
 Shoushan (Xingcheng)